Elisha Kiprop Barno (born 1985) is a Kenyan marathon runner. Barno was the men's defending champion at the Grandma's Marathon, winning the race from 2015 to 2018. He has won several marathons during his career, including the Los Angeles Marathon, the Jacksonville Marathon, and the California International Marathon.

His best time is 2:09:32, run in Houston in 2018.

References

External links 
 

1985 births
Living people
Kenyan male marathon runners
Kenyan male long-distance runners
20th-century Kenyan people
21st-century Kenyan people